The 2017 NCAA Division I Men's Lacrosse Championship was played on Memorial Day weekend in May 2017 at Gillette Stadium in Foxborough, Massachusetts.

This was the 47th annual single-elimination tournament to determine the national championship for National Collegiate Athletic Association (NCAA) Division I men's college lacrosse.

Seventeen teams competed in the tournament, based upon their performance during the regular season. For nine teams entry into the tournament was by means of a conference tournament automatic qualifier, eight teams received at-large selections.

Maryland won their 3rd NCAA title, defeating Ohio State 9-6. This was Maryland's first national title since 1975.

Matt Rambo finally led the Terps to their long awaited national title, in the Terps third straight championship game.

Teams

Bracket

Tournament boxscores

Tournament Finals

Tournament Semi-Finals

Tournament Quarterfinals

Tournament First Round

All-Tournament Team
Tim Muller, Maryland (Most Outstanding Player)
Tom Carey, Ohio State
Ryan Drenner, Towson
Connor Kelly, Maryland
Tre Leclaire, Ohio State
Dylan Maltz, Maryland
Dan Morris, Maryland
Matt Rambo, Maryland
Tim Rotanz, Maryland
Ethan Walker, Denver

References

NCAA Division I Men's Lacrosse Championship
 
NCAA Division I Men's Lacrosse Championship
NCAA Division I Men's Lacrosse Championship
College sports in Massachusetts
Lacrosse in Massachusetts
Sports competitions in Foxborough, Massachusetts